Miss Europe 1935 was the eighth edition of the Miss Europe pageant and the seventh edition under French journalist Maurice de Waleffe. It was held in Torquay, England, United Kingdom on July 6, 1935. Alicia Navarro Cambronero of Spain, was crowned Miss Europe 1935.

Results

Placements

Contestants 

 - Stéphanie Boumans
 - Trude Böhm
 - Ellen Örregaard
 -  Gisèle Préville
 - Muriel Oxford
 - Nicky Papadopoulou
 - Stella Elte
 Hungarian Danube - Mária Nagy
 - Eva Feher
 - Vanna Panzarasa
 - Gerd Lovlien
 Rhenanie (Saar Region) - Elizabeth Pitz
  (In exile) - Marianne Gorbatovsky
 - Alicia Navarro Cambronero
 Tunis, Tunisia - Georgette Temmos

References

External links 
 

Miss Europe
1935 in England